Steven William Barnett (born June 6, 1943) is a retired water polo player from the United States, who competed in two consecutive Summer Olympics for his native country, starting in 1968. He won the bronze medal with the Men's National Team at the 1972 Summer Olympics in Munich, West Germany.

Barnett played college water polo for California State University, Long Beach.  He coached the water polo team and the swimming and diving team at Cupertino and Lynbrook High Schools in Cupertino and  San Jose, California.

In 1982, he was inducted into the USA Water Polo Hall of Fame.

See also
 List of Olympic medalists in water polo (men)
 List of men's Olympic water polo tournament goalkeepers

References

External links
 

1943 births
Living people
American male water polo players
Water polo goalkeepers
Water polo players at the 1968 Summer Olympics
Water polo players at the 1972 Summer Olympics
Olympic bronze medalists for the United States in water polo
Place of birth missing (living people)
Medalists at the 1972 Summer Olympics
Long Beach State Beach men's water polo players
American water polo coaches